Black Spot or black spot may refer to:

Diseases
 Black spot (roses), a plant disease caused by a fungus
 Black spot disease (fish), a fish disease also known as diplopstomiasis
 Black spot leaf disease, a plant disease affecting certain grape varieties

Film and television
 Black Spot, a short Israeli film in the pastiche Yellow Asphalt 
 Black spot, place in which television reception is impossible
 The Black Spot (film), a 1914 British silent thriller film
 Black Spot (TV series), a French-Belgian television series

Other uses
 Accident blackspot or black spot, a place where road traffic accidents have historically been concentrated
 Black spot, a section of roadway designated as an accident black spot in the Australian Government's Black Spot Program 
 Black Spot (aircraft), a series of attack aircraft tested by the US Air Force in the Vietnam War
 Black spot, a marking made on Hindu children in South Asia to protect them from the evil eye, or nazar battu 
 Black Spot (Treasure Island), a literary device in Treasure Island, a novel by Robert Louis Stevenson
 La Tache noire, an 1887 painting by Albert Bettannier whose title translates to The Black Spot

See also
 Blackspot (disambiguation)
 Black dot (disambiguation)
 Black hole (disambiguation) 
 Blackmark (disambiguation)